Pseudalypia is a genus of moths of the family Noctuidae erected by Henry Edwards in 1874. Some authors include it in Acontia, but it is tentatively treated as different here pending further research.

Species
 Pseudalypia crotchii H. Edwards, 1874
 Pseudalypia stuartii Schaus, 1889

References

Agaristinae